John Kannenberg (Milwaukee, WI) is a multimedia artist, curator, writer, and researcher who creates quietly reflective work that investigates the sonic geography of museums and archives, the psychology of collection, the processes of making and observing art, and the human experience of time. His art practice emphasises process, creating and breaking rules for the work's realisation in ways that blur the boundaries between intention and accident. Since 2015, Kannenberg has been Director and Chief Curator of The Museum of Portable Sound, a hand-held museum of curated sounds currently accessible to visitors in the greater London area.

External links
 johnkannenberg.com - Artist's personal website.
 The Museum of Portable Sound - An institution founded by Kannenberg that researches the collection, curation, and display of sound as a museological object while critiquing conventional museum practices and industry-imposed limitations on the digital distribution of sound.
 Hours of Infinity - Catalogue for a series of solo exhibitions and performances (Kelsey Museum Publications Series). 
 A Canticle for Leibowitz - A "possible soundtrack" for the novel by Walter M. Miller, Jr.
 United Stasis - Interview with Kannenberg conducted by Marc Weidenbaum.
 Stasisfield.com - An experimental music label and interdisciplinary digital art space presenting works by a diverse collection of artists from around the globe, created, designed, and curated by Kannenberg, which operated from 2002 to 2015.

American artists
American electronic musicians
Living people
Year of birth missing (living people)